Casimiro Andrada was born in Zambales and married to Justa Acolentava, a native of Carles, Iloilo. He headed the Separation Movement of the Municipality of Carles (in the Province of Iloilo, Philippines), succeeded in getting the approval of the Carleseños petition for separation from Balasan.

Political Life
During the annexation of Carles to Balasan, Casimiro Andrada became the 5th Municipal President of Balasan.

Legacy
The Don Casimero Andrada National High School or DCANHS is a Flagship Secondary School in the Municipality of Carles, Iloilo named after Casimiro Andrada a Philanthropist of the said town. Today DCANHS stand firm in its mission by producing  more productive, highly educated, motivated and competitive Carleseños.

See also
 Carles, Iloilo
 Balasan, Iloilo

References

Filipino activists
People from Iloilo
People from Zambales
Mayors of places in Iloilo
Living people
Year of birth missing (living people)